The titles are given to certain individual of families in Kerala.

Families surnames
 Nair - A prevalent and high  Caste.
 Menon-Menon is a surname of the Nair community of Kerala, India, and is an honorific hereditary title, often used as an affix to one's name, bestowed by the various kings of Kerala (including the Zamorin) to the members of Nair subcastes.
 Kurup -Kurup of Travancore (alternatively Guyrip, Kuruppu or Kuruppanmar) was a sub caste / title used by Nairs in the Kingdom of Travancore who held Naduvazhi status. They belong to the Nair caste.
Chekavar - Most Commonly 19th Century in Malabar area.
Moopan - All Kerala and North Malabar most commonly.
Thirumulpad - Most commonly used Northern Kerala and south parts.
Koya - (Muslim) Malappuram district.
Kongassery (Kongasseri) -Hindu (Palessena).
Koranchath (Koranchath) -Hindu (Malampuzha).
Channar - south Kerala.
Panicker - All kerala
Pillai - southern Kerala and Trivandrum. 
Kaimal - Southern Kerala.
Panikkar - North malabar and All Kerala
Cherayi Panikkar - North Malabar
Nambiar - North Kerala and central states.
Moopil Nair- Palakkad District
Achari - south part 
Ezhuthachan - Malappuram and Thrissur District.
Vaidyar - All Kerala.
Thandan - Palakkad areas commonly use name.
Kartha
 Varma- High caste Kshatriyas .Kerala royal family , ruling dynasty
 Nadar-Southern kerala (Thiruvanantapuram mainly)
 The Nambudiri -(Malayalam pronunciation: [n̪ɐmbuːd̪iɾi]), also transliterated as Nampoothiri, Nambūdiri, Namboodiri, Namboothiri and Nampūtiri, are a Malayali Brahmin caste, native to what is now the state of Kerala, India, where they constituted part of the traditional feudal elite.
 Potti-Potti, also written as Potty, is a sect of Brahmins in Kerala state of India. 
 Sharma
 Shenoy-Konkani people used in Kasargod district.

Only Family/ Dynasty persons
Zamorin - Malabar Dynasty title.
Swaroopam - Most commonly used Title of Kerala.
Thamban - Malabar some dynasties used.
Marakkar - chief commander of Kozhikode Zamorin.
Mannanar- Kannur dynasty.
Varma - High caste and Most used commonly Dynasties and Rajas.Members  of royal  family of Kerala have this surname .

References

Surnames of Indian origin
Kerala-related lists